A rope line is a setting in which a major celebrity, i.e. movie star, musician, supermodel, politician, internet celebrity, interacts with the general public.  A crowd control barrier – originally a rope but now typically a secure metal fence – separates the celebrity from the crowd. In American political terminology, a politician "walking down the rope line" or "working the rope line" is engaging with his supporters – hand shaking, chatting, signing autographs and providing photo opportunities.

Popular use
In 2004, U.S. President George W. Bush explained that he had only met Ahmed Chalabi in informal settings, such as when he was "just kind of working through the rope line" at the 2004 State of the Union address.

Footnotes

Celebrity
Perimeter security